Ichhu Rutuna (Quechua  ichhu Peruvian feather grass (stipa ichu), rutuna sickle, "ichhu sickle", also spelled Ichurutuna) is a mountain in the Chunta mountain range in the Andes of Peru, about  high. It is located in the Huancavelica Region, Castrovirreyna Province, on the border of the districts of Chupamarca and Aurahuá. Ichhu Rutuna lies north of Wallu Q'asa, northeast of Wichinka Lake and east of Qarwa Q'asa.

References

Mountains of Huancavelica Region
Mountains of Peru